Patak-e Bajgan (also Romanized as Pātak-e Bajgān; also known as Pātak, Pātak-e Shabkūh, and Pātak-e Shokūh) is a village in Bajgan Rural District, Aseminun District, Manujan County, Kerman Province, Iran. At the 2006 census, its population was 2,019, in 451 families.

References 

Populated places in Manujan County